Nowy Dwór  is a village in the administrative district of Gmina Szydłowo, within Piła County, Greater Poland Voivodeship, in west-central Poland.

The village has a population of 279.

References

Villages in Piła County